Roseburn is a suburb of Edinburgh, the capital of Scotland.

The area lies in the west of the city, approximately a 20-minute walk from the city centre, west of Haymarket and close to the Murrayfield area (and Murrayfield Stadium). It is immediately to the south of the A8 road.

The Water of Leith flows along one side of Roseburn Park next to the Water of Leith Walkway. Other boundaries to the park are Murrayfield Stadium and Murrayfield Ice Rink. The park is used for football in the winter and cricket in the summer. It has a small play area popular with pre-school and young children. The park is popular with dog walkers.

Roseburn Primary School offers education for children from Nursery to Primary 7. The main building is Victorian and has listed building status.

Businesses located in Roseburn include bars, restaurants, take aways, groceries, art work, jewellery, flowers, home furnishings, pharmaceutical goods, furniture and hairdressing.

Transport 
Roseburn is served by Lothian Buses services 12, X18, 26, 31, and the Airlink (100), McGill's Scotland East services 18, X24, X25 & X38, Scottish Citylink services 900 & 909, and Murrayfield tram stop.

Notable residents
 Wendy Wood, Scottish nationalist, artist, writer and Jackanory presenter.

References

External links
 Google Maps
 Roseburn Primary School Website

Areas of Edinburgh